These are the official results of the Women's Points Race at the 1996 Summer Olympics in Atlanta, United States. The event debuted at these Games.

Medalists

Race

References

External links
IOC web site
Union cycliste internationale web site

W
Cycling at the Summer Olympics – Women's points race
Track cycling at the 1996 Summer Olympics
Olymp
Cyc